McCurdy & Rhodes is an American naval architecture design firm, originally based in Cold Spring Harbor, New York and now located in nearby Oyster Bay, New York. The company specializes in the design of fiberglass sailboats.

The company was founded in 1965 by James A. McCurdy and Philip ("Bodie") H. Rhodes. Rhodes is the son of naval architect Philip L. Rhodes and both company principals got their start at Philip L. Rhodes, Naval Architects and Marine Engineers, where McCurdy was head of the Yacht Design Section and Bodie Rhodes did design work.

History
After its formation, the firm was involved in the design of many boats for Seafarer Yachts in the 1970s and 1980s.

McCurdy's son, Ian A. McCurdy, graduated from Rensselaer Polytechnic Institute with a degree in civil engineering and also graduated from the University of Michigan, with BS and a MS degrees in naval architecture and marine engineering. In 1980,  Ian A. McCurdy joined McCurdy & Rhodes from his previous post at the American Bureau of Shipping, where he was an engineer in charge of computer analysis, working on structure and stability of large commercial ships. After this father's death, Ian A. McCurdy became the chief designer.

In the 1980s the firm redesigned Philip L. Rhodes' steel Rhodes 77 for aluminum construction for a single boat built by the Burger Boat Company in Manitowoc, Wisconsin.

The firm has produced more than 100 designs for boats from  length overall, with a focus on off-shore racers.

Boats 
Summary of production boats designed by McCurdy & Rhodes:

Seafarer 31 Mark I - 1968
Seafarer 29 - 1972
Seafarer 34 - 1972
Heritage 35 - 1974
Seafarer 24 - 1974
Seafarer 31 Mark II - 1974
Seafarer 22 - 1976
Seafarer 23 - 1976
Seafarer 26 - 1977
Seafarer 23 Challenger - 1978
Seafarer 30 - 1978
Swiftsure 30 - 1978
Rhodes 77 - 1980s
Seafarer 37 - 1980
Hinckley 42 Competition - 1982
Sou'wester 42/43 - 1982
Sou'wester 59 - 1959
Intrepid 35 - 1983
Sou'wester 51 - 1984
Navy 44 (M&R) - 1985
Sou'wester 51 CC - 1986
Hinckley 43 (McCurdy & Rhodes) - 1990

See also
List of sailboat designers and manufacturers

References

External links

McCurdy & Rhodes